This is a list of Dr. Finlay's Casebook television episodes from the series that ran from 1962 until 1971. It had eight series of original episodes. Series one to seven aired in black and white, series eight was aired in colour. A total of 191 50-minute episodes were produced; 122 are missing.

Series overview

Episodes

Series 1 (1962)
This series is the only series to have no episodes missing.

Series 2 (1963–64)

Series 3 (1965)

Series 4 (1965–66)

Series 5 (1966–67)

Series 6 (1967–68)

Series 7 (1969)

Series 8 (1970–71)
This series was produced in colour. This was the final series.

Lists of British drama television series episodes